Rob Davis (born ca. 1964) is a Canadian politician. He served on the York city council from 1991 to 1997, and was a member of the Toronto City Council from 1997 to 2000.

Background
Davis was born in Toronto, Ontario, and received a Bachelor of Arts degree in political science from York University. He worked as a stockbroker in private life.

Election to York city council
He was one of six new councillors elected for York in the 1991 municipal election, as city residents voted out a number of incumbents following the revelations of the Fairbank Park Scandal. Davis was the first Black Canadian elected to the York council in the city's 200-year history.

He was re-elected to the York council in the 1994 election. His council experience includes service on the Administrative Services Committee, the Works and Parks Committee, the boards of health, the Northwestern General Hospital, the York Library and the St. Clair Community Youth Services.

1996 Ontario by-election
He campaigned for the Legislative Assembly of Ontario in a 1996 by-election in York South, as a candidate of the Progressive Conservative Party when New Democratic Party (NDP) leader Bob Rae vacated his seat. Davis defeated Zubair Chowdhry for the Progressive Conservative nomination, and placed third in the election with 5,093 votes (25.69%). The winner was Gerard Kennedy who shortly afterwards sought the leadership of the Liberals. City councillor David Miller finished second for the NDP. Davis was 32 years old at the time.

Toronto City Council
The City of York was amalgamated into the new City of Toronto in 1997, and Davis was elected to Toronto City Council in the 1997 election as one of two members for Ward 28. He served as chair of Toronto's crime prevention task force, and in 2000 was the driving force behind a gun buyback program which allocated fifty dollars to any city resident who surrendered a gun. The program was generally considered a success, and Davis has said that the city was able to collect over 2,000 guns in less than two weeks. He also served as vice-chair of the Toronto Transit Commission (TTC) from 1997 to 2000.

Davis was known as a right-wing councillor, and often highlighted tax reduction and law-and-order issues.  An ally of mayor Mel Lastman, he sought to have Howard Moscoe removed as TTC chair in 1999. In 1998, Davis was one of 13 councillors to vote against same-sex benefits for city employees.

Defeat
The wards in Toronto were redistributed prior to the 2000 election, and some sitting councillors were forced to face one another for re-election.  Davis was defeated in Ward 21, losing to fellow councillor Joe Mihevc by over 3,500 votes following a very divisive contest. He sought to return to council in the 2003 campaign in Ward 33 in the eastern part of the former city of North York, but was narrowly defeated by Shelley Carroll.

2003 election
During the 2003 contest, Davis supported tenant advocacy, the restoration of rent control and gas tax financing for the TTC. Acknowledging that Progressive Conservative governments at the provincial level had opposed all three initiatives, he said, "I differed with my party".

He has worked as a consultant since leaving the council. In 2004, he organized a march in support of police chief Julian Fantino, after it was announced that the deadlocked Toronto Police Services Board would not renew Fantino's contract.

Return to politics
In April 2008, he was appointed to replace trustee Christine Nunziata, who resigned due to allegations over her spending.

Davis was appointed to Ward 6 (York) of the Toronto Catholic District School Board to replace Christine Nunziata, who was removed for missing three consecutive board meetings, on May 8, 2010.  Immediately after his appointment, Davis said there needed to be an "infrastructure of integrity" in place before the Trustees can restore parent confidence and move on from the Trustee spending scandal. His first motion as trustee was to call upon the board to create an integrity commissioner position at their next meeting held on May 14, 2010.

In the 2010 municipal election, Davis ran unsuccessfully for Toronto City Council from Ward 15 in an attempt to replace Howard Moscoe.

Election results

Unofficial results as of October 26, 2010 03:55 AM

References

External links
City of Toronto profile

Living people
Businesspeople from Toronto
Toronto city councillors
Black Canadian politicians
York University alumni
Black Canadian businesspeople
Toronto Catholic District School Board trustees
1964 births